James Albert Harder, Ph.D., (December 2, 1926 – December 30, 2006) was a professor of civil and hydraulic engineering at the University of California, Berkeley. He was a professor emeritus there.  Harder also had interest in ufology.

Engineering
Harder taught in civil engineering at several levels, including practical aspects like lab experiments relating to the field and model testing.  He produced few papers but was known for their quality.

Harder is notable for his contributions that advanced the field of flow simulations, including before the use of computers became ubiquitous.  A paper he co-authored, Sea Water Intrusion in California, received an American Water Works Association award in 1957. His work was applied at Suisun Bay and the Mekong Delta.  He also studied fish protection facilities.

He eventually studied fluid mechanics in the context of medicine.  He worked on the development of electric artificial hearts and gastrointestinal endoscopes as well as equipment to prevent the need for external bags associated with colostomy.

Ufology

Harder believed Unidentified flying objects to be extraterrestrial beings and testified to the House of Representatives Committee on Science and Astronautics.  He was part of the Aerial Phenomena Research Organization (APRO).

Education
 B.S., 1948,  California Institute of Technology
 M.S., Civil Engineering, 1952, UC Berkeley
 Ph.D., Fluid Mechanics, 1957, UC Berkeley

Career
 U.S. Navy, 1944-45 (electronics technician)
 Design Engineer, soil conservation service, U.S. Department of Agriculture, 1948–50
 UC Berkeley, Resident engineer, 1952–57
 UC Berkeley, assistant professor, hydraulic engineering, 1957–62
 UC Berkeley, associate professor of civil engineering, 1962–70
 UC Berkeley, professor of civil engineering, 1970–91
 UC Berkeley, professor emeritus (1991)

Organizations

Fellow of the American Association for the Advancement of Science (AAAS)
Fellow of the American Society of Civil Engineers (ASCE)
Founding member, Society for Scientific Exploration website

References

External links
1968 House of Representatives Committee on Science and Astronautics, UFO panel, testimony and biography
Interview with Harder on alien abductions
1998 UC Berkeley newspaper article, Harder’s controversial views of a "Galactic Federation" of aliens and alien channeling with humans
Harder’s comments on a famous flying disc photo
University of California Biography
James A. Harder Biography in French

1926 births
2006 deaths
UC Berkeley College of Engineering faculty
People from Fullerton, California
Ufologists
California Institute of Technology alumni
University of California, Berkeley alumni